A Choral Christmas is an album by German cross-cultural new-age band Cusco. It was released in 1995.

The album was produced in collaboration with the Munich Opera Choir. The tracks feature a fusion of slow vocal melodies with music of late Middle Ages and Renaissance, and instrumentally reflect on their previous Concierto de Aranjuez album from 1986. Unlike any other Cusco album, the choirs are predominant in most tracks, the exceptions being the instrumental "Canon" and "Swan Lake / The Nutcracker". This album was also released on the Prudence label under the title A Cusco Christmas.

Track listing 
 "There Comes A Vessel Laden / In Dulci Jubilo"
 "Silent Night"
 "Jesus Stays My Joy"
 "Lo, How A Rose"
 "Canon"
 "From Heaven Above"
 "Christ The Lord Is Born Today"
 "Swan Lake / The Nutcracker"
 "Soon It Will Be Night"
 "Shepherd's Christmas Symphonia"

Album credits 
 Matt Marshall – Executive producer 
 Kristian Schultze – Arranger, programming, choir master
 Dan Selene – Executive producer
 Joseph L. Steiner III – Digital mastering
 Murry Whiteman – Art direction, design 
 Maria Ehrenreich – Project coordinator
 Koji Yamashita – Photography 
 Johannes Walter – Photography
 Michael Holm – Arranger, voices, producer, mixing 
 William Aura – Digital mastering
 Cusco – Main performer

References 

1995 Christmas albums
Christmas albums by German artists
Cusco (band) albums
New-age Christmas albums